The 16th congressional district of Ohio is an obsolete United States congressional district last represented by Representative Anthony Gonzalez (R). It was last located in the northeast of the state, covering Wayne County and with arms extending north into the suburbs of Cleveland, and east into Greater Akron and Stark County. The district was eliminated upon the swearing in of the 118th United States Congress on January 3, 2023, as the reapportionment after the 2020 census reduced the number of congressional districts in Ohio to fifteen.

History 
From 2003 to 2013, the district was based in Stark County and the Canton area, and also included Wayne County and most of Medina and Ashland counties. It also includes some rural communities east of Akron, as well as some of the western suburbs of Cleveland.

On November 2, 2010, Democrat John Boccieri lost his bid for a second term to Republican Jim Renacci, who was seated in January 2011. In January 2018, Renacci announced his candidacy for the U.S. Senate. Anthony Gonzalez was elected on November 6 to succeed him.

Election results from presidential races

List of members representing the district

Election results

2010

2012

2014

2016

2018

2020 

The following chart shows historic election results. Bold type indicates victor. Italic type indicates incumbent.

Historical district boundaries

See also
Ohio's congressional districts
List of United States congressional districts

References
Specific

General
 
 
 Congressional Biographical Directory of the United States 1774–present

16
Constituencies established in 1833
1833 establishments in Ohio
Constituencies disestablished in 2023
2023 disestablishments in Ohio